Salmon Cycle Marker is a 2005 sculpture by Ken MacKintosh and Lillian Pitt, installed outside Portland State University's Native American Student and Community Center, in the U.S. state of Oregon.

Description and history

Salmon Cycle Marker is installed at the intersection of Southwest Broadway and Jackson, just west of the Native American Student and Community Center on the Portland State University campus. The abstract sculpture, made of wood, bronze, and stainless steel, depicts salmon in the Columbia River Gorge, and their journey from birth to spawning. Its pole is made from three trees that fell during the 1980 eruption of Mount St. Helens. Images of salmon eggs appear at the base. The middle of the pole shows an image of Pitt's She Who Watches. MacKintosh's depiction of two salmon mating, as well as an abstract image of a salmon, appear at the top of the pole. According to Portland State University, the work is inspired by totem poles, and serves as a metaphor of "regional symbolism".

The sculpture has been included in at least one published walking tour of Portland.

See also

 2005 in art

References

2005 establishments in Oregon
2005 sculptures
Abstract sculptures in Oregon
Animal sculptures
Bronze sculptures in Oregon
Fish in art
Outdoor sculptures in Portland, Oregon
Portland State University campus
Stainless steel sculptures in Oregon
Wooden sculptures in Oregon